Pelophryne, commonly known as flathead toads or dwarf toads, is a genus of true toads, family Bufonidae. The genus occurs in the Philippines, Borneo, Malaya including Singapore, and Hainan (China). Molecular data suggest that Pelophryne is the sister taxon of Ansonia.

Description and ecology
Pelophryne are small, semi-arboreal toads. They can easily be recognized by the peculiar, fleshy web of their fingers and toes. The genus can be divided into two groups: one with rounded but not expanded finger tips, and the other with the tips of the fingers expanded into truncate discs. This morphological division is supported by molecular data.

This is suggestive of resource partitioning.

The tadpoles are specialized for rapid development in very small rain water pools. The eggs are relatively large, and the tadpoles appear to subsist the larval period on yolk. The tadpoles have a degenerate oral disk and lack a spiracle.

Species
The following species are recognized in the genus Pelophryne:

In addition, the AmphibiaWeb recognizes Pelophryne macrotis as distinct from Pelophryne guentheri.

References

 
Amphibian genera
Amphibians of Asia
Taxa named by Thomas Barbour